This article refers to the sports broadcasting contracts in Australia. For a list of other country's broadcasting rights, see Sports television broadcast contracts.

Certain sporting events are protected by Australia's Anti-siphoning laws which means free-to-air television broadcasters have the chance to bid on protected events before pay television.

Association Football

Football

Leagues

Australia:
A-League Men:
Paramount+ Sports (2021/22–2025/26): Live coverage of every game.
Network 10 (2021/22–2025/26): One game every Saturday night and a Sunday afternoon match plus all finals and grand final live.
A-League Women: 
Paramount+ Sports (2021/22–2025/26): Live coverage of every game.
10 Play (2021/22–2025/26): Every Game Live on 10 Play from starting season 2022/23.

Asia:
Chinese Super League: SBS Australia
Indian Super League: OneFootball
J-League: Optus Sport (2020–present) Four matches per week live and on demand.
K-League: SportsFlick, K League TV
Saudi Professional League: 10 Play

Europe:
English Premier League: Optus Sport (2016/17-2027/28): All matches live and on demand
English Football League Championship: beIN Sports (2022/2023-)
English Football League One:beIN Sports (2022/2023-)
English Football League Two: beIN Sports (2022/2023-)
English Women's Super League: Optus Sport (Up to 50 Games Per Season)
French Ligue 1: beIN Sports: 
French Ligue 2: beIN Sports
German Bundesliga: beIN Sports: All matches live and on demand.
Italian Serie A: beIN Sports: All matches live and on demand
Spanish La Liga: Optus Sport: All matches live and on demand.
Spanish La Liga 2: Optus Sport: Occasional game on Tuesday morning.
Spanish Liga F: DAZN
Belgian First Division: ESPN: Three matches per round live and on demand.
Scottish Premiership: beIN Sports
Latvian Higher League: OneFootball
Danish Superliga: OneFootball
Besta deild karla: OneFootball
Regionalliga Nord: OneFootball
Regionalliga West: OneFootball
Ekstraklasa: OneFootball
Eliteserien: OneFootball
Czech First League: OneFootball
Swiss Super League: OneFootball
Austrian Football Bundesliga: OneFootball
Moldovan Super Liga: OneFootball
Slovenian PrvaLiga: OneFootball
Slovak Super Liga: OneFootball
North America:
Major League Soccer: MLS Season Pass
South America:
Argentine Primera División: OneFootball
Campeonato Brasileiro Série A: OneFootball

Domestic Cups

Australia Cup Network 10 (final only), 10 play (round of 32 onwards)
Saudi King's Cup: 10 Play
English FA Cup: Network 10, Paramount+ Sports (2021/2022-)
English Football League (include EFL Cup): beIN Sports (2022/2023-)
FA Community Shield: Network 10, Paramount+ Sports (2022-)
Spanish Super Cup: SBS (2021 and 2022)
German DFB-Supercup: beIN Sports
German DFB-Pokal: Optus Sport (2022/23 – 2024/25)
German DFB-Pokal Frauen: Optus Sport (2022/23 – 2024/25)
French Trophée des Champions: beIN Sports
Belgian Cup: ESPN
Belgian Super Cup: ESPN
Scottish Cup: beIN Sports
Scottish League Cup: beIN Sports
Lamar Hunt U.S. Open Cup: ESPN
Kazakhstan Cup: OneFootball

International Club Competitions/Tournaments

AFC Champions League: 
 10 Play, Paramount+ Sports (All matches live and exclusive)
CONMEBOL Libertadores:
beIN Sports (2019–2026) All matches live and exclusive.
CONMEBOL Sudamericana: 
beIN Sports (2019–2026) All matches live and exclusive.
CONMEBOL Recopa:
beIN Sports (2019–2026) Both matches live and exclusive.
UEFA Super Cup:
 Stan Sport (2021–23)
UEFA Champions League:
 Stan Sport (2021–24), Nine Network (2021/22- 2023/24 – final only) 
UEFA Europa League:
 Stan Sport (2021–24)
UEFA Europa Conference League
 Stan Sport (2021–24)
UEFA Women's Champions League
 DAZN (2021–25)
FIFA Club World Cup: 
SBS (2022)
International Champions Cup: 
beIN Sports (2021-)

Club channel coverage

 Arsenal TV: beIN Sports (2019- )
Barça TV: beIN Sports (2019- )
Celtic TV: beIN Sports (2019- )
Chelsea TV: beIN Sports (2019- )
 Citytv: beIN Sports (2019- )
FCBtv: beIN Sports (2019- )
Inter Channel: beIN Sports (2019- )
Juventus Channel: beIN Sports (2019- )
LFC TV: beIN Sports (2019- )
Milan Channel: beIN Sports (2019- )
MUTV: beIN Sports (2019- )
Rangers TV: beIN Sports (2019- )
 Real Madrid TV: beIN Sports (2019- )
 Spurs TV: beIN Sports (2019- )

International Matches

Australian Men's Team (Socceroos) matches:
Network 10: (2021–) Live coverage of every friendlies and Asian qualifiers, including AFC Asian Cup 2023 finals and excluding FIFA World Cup 2022 finals.
Paramount+ Sports: (2021–) Live coverage of every friendlies and Asian qualifiers, including AFC Asian Cup 2023 finals and excluding FIFA World Cup 2022 finals.
Australian Youth: Network 10: (2021–) Live coverage of Socceroos home matches only.
Australian Women's Team (Matildas) matches: 
Network 10: (2021-) Live coverage of every friendlies and Asian qualifiers, including AFC Asian Cup 2022 finals and excluding FIFA World Cup 2023 finals.
Paramount+ Sports: (2021–) Live coverage of every friendlies and Asian qualifiers, including AFC Asian Cup 2022 finals and excluding FIFA World Cup 2023 finals.
FIFA World Cup qualification (UEFA): Optus Sport
FIFA World Cup qualification (CAF): beIN Sports
FIFA World Cup qualification (CONMEBOL): beIN Sports
FIFA World Cup qualification (AFC):
Network 10 (Socceroos matches only)
10 Play (All International Matches)
UEFA Internationals: Optus Sport
Other International Matches: SBS

International Tournaments
AFC Asian Cup: 
Network 10 (2023): All matches live
Copa América
Optus Sport (2021): All matches live
2026 FIFA World Cup: 
 (2026): TBA
2023 FIFA Women's World Cup
 Optus Sport (2023): All matches live (including play-off tournament matches)
 Seven Network (2023): 15 matches live (including all Australia matches)
UEFA European Championship: Optus Sport
UEFA Women's Championship: Optus Sport
UEFA European Championship Qualifying: Optus Sport
UEFA Nations League: Optus Sport
Other FIFA Tournaments: SBS
Africa Cup of Nations: beIN Sports
WAFU Nations Cup: ESPN
Toulon Tournament: ESPN
Florida Cup: beIN Sports

Other

National Premier Leagues Victoria: NPL.TV, YouTube
National Premier Leagues NSW: NPL.TV, YouTube
National Premier Leagues South Australia: NPL.TV
National Premier Leagues Queensland: FQTV, YouTube
National Premier Leagues Northern NSW: NPL.TV, BarTV Sports Football
National Premier Leagues ACT: NPL.TV
Capital Football ACT: BarTV Sports Football (Australia Cup Qualifiers rounds)
Capital Football Federation Cup : BarTV Sports Football
National Premier Leagues Western Australia: Streamer.com.au, YouTube
National Premier Leagues Tasmania: NPL.TV

Former Australian football show & broadcasting events
 SBS shows a football fixture as part of their Sunday afternoon football show The World Game. This is often a game from one of a number of South American/European or Asian leagues.
 Aurora has a one-hour highlights program showing highlights from Australia's various amateur leagues each week, called the Australian Premier League Highlights Show.
 Channel 31 Melbourne VPL highlights program.
 Fox Sports Australia A-League, FFA Cup and Australian International Matches

Futsal

International Tournaments 

Africa Futsal Cup of Nations: beIN Sports (2020-)

International Club Competitions/Tournaments 

UEFA Futsal Champions League: SBS (final four only)

Athletics 
IAAF World Championships in Athletics: SBS Australia and beIN Sports (2022)
IAAF Diamond League: Fox Sports & Kayo Sports
European Athletics Championships: Fox Sports (2018)
Australian Athletics Tour: Fox Sports & Kayo Sports
Australian Athletics Championships: Fox Sports, Kayo Sports & 7plus
 Australian All Schools Championships: Fox Sports & Kayo Sports
 Australian 10,000m Championships: Fox Sports & Kayo Sports
 Australian 20 km Race Walking Championships: Fox Sports & Kayo Sports

Australian rules football
Australian Football League:
Seven Network: (2017–2024) 3-4 matches per round live nationally. Friday night (1 match), Saturday night (1 match) and Sunday afternoon (3.20pm eastern time zone slot match). Further 11 games on public holidays / eve. Between 5-6 Thursday night games. Local teams replace broadcast into local markets every week of the season in SA, WA, QLD & NSW. 3 games each season in SA & WA featuring a local team broadcast on delayed basis.
 Finals Series: Every match live nationally including the Grand Final exclusively.
 Fox Footy: (2017–2024) 6 matches per round, live nationally. They also simulcast the remaining 3 matches from Seven Network therefore broadcasting 9 matches per round, live nationally.
 Finals Series: Every match live nationally except the Grand Final.
Seven Network: (2025–2031) 3-4 matches per round live nationally. Thursday night, Friday night (1 match), Selected Saturday night (1 match) and Sunday afternoon (3.20pm eastern time zone slot match). Further 11 games on public holidays / eve. The first 15 rounds of Thursday night games and the last 8 rounds of Saturday night games. Local teams replace broadcast into local markets every week of the season in SA, WA, QLD & NSW. 3 games each season in SA & WA featuring a local team broadcast on delayed basis.
 Finals Series: Every match live nationally including the Grand Final exclusively.
 Fox Footy: (2025–2031) All 9 matches per round presented with Fox Footy's Own Commentary team live nationally. Super Saturday matches, live and exclusive for the first 15 rounds.
 Finals Series: Every match live nationally except the Grand Final.
Australian Football League: Pre-season Community Series
 Fox Footy: (2017–2024)
 Exclusive broadcast of all AAMI Community Series matches.
 Fox Footy: (2025–2031)
AFL Women's:
 Seven Network:(2019–2024) Three games a round plus the non-Victorian matches on Free to Air. 
 Fox Footy: (2019–2024) Every Match Live including the Grand Final.
 Seven Network: (2025–2031) Three games a round plus the non-Victorian matches on Free to Air. 
 Fox Footy: (2025–2031) Every Match Live including the Grand Final.
Brownlow Medal:
 Seven Network: (2017–2024) Exclusive coverage.
 Seven Network: (2025–2031) Exclusive coverage.

State Leagues
Victorian Football League: Seven Network (2021-) in Victoria & AFL.com.au 
South Australian National Football League: Seven Network (2022–) in Adelaide & SANFL Now App
West Australian Football League: Seven Network (2022–) in Perth & AFL.com.au
Tasmanian Football League:, AFL Tasmania YouTube, AFL.com.au – Finals only
AFL Canberra: Cluch.TV (2020-)

Others
E. J. Whitten Legends Game: TBA
AFL Under 18 Championships: Fox Footy

Baseball
Major League Baseball: ESPN, Apple TV+ 
Postseason – ESPN (Live & delayed rights)
World Series: ESPN
College Baseball: ESPN
Little League World Series: ESPN
World Baseball Classic: ESPN
Women's Baseball World Cup: ESPN – Selection of key games
Australian Baseball League: Ondemand Baseball Australia – Every Game Live

Basketball
National Basketball League:
 ESPN (2021/22-2023/24) All 140 regular season games, plus finals and the NBL Grand Final Series
 Kayo Sports (2021/22-2023/24) All regular season games, plus finals and NBL Grand Final Series streamed
 Kayo Freebies (2021/22-2023/24) Two games per week free-to-view, all NBL Grand Final Series games streamed free
 Network 10 (2021/22-2023/24) Two live games per week every Sunday, select finals and NBL Grand Final Series games (usually afternoon games)  live and free-to-air on 10 Peach. Christmas Day game and select Grand Final Series (as NBL Sprint) games on 10.
NBL1:
 Kayo Freebies (2021/22-2023/24) 10 games of the week plus national championship games streamed for free
Women's National Basketball League: 
 9Now (2022/23–) All remaining matches live every weekend.
 ESPN (2022/23–) 16 regular season games live and all finals 
National Basketball Association: 
ESPN (2016/17–2024/25) Up to 188 regular-season games including five Boxing Day games back-to-back; up to 53 playoff games including the entirety of the Eastern and Western Conference Finals and every game of the NBA Finals; NBA All-Star, including Rising Stars Challenge, All-Star Saturday Night and the NBA All-Star Game; and NBA Summer League games.
Women's National Basketball Association: 
 ESPN (2016–2025)

International
Australian Boomers matches: ESPN
Australian Opals matches: ESPN
FIBA Basketball World Cup: ESPN (2023)
FIBA Women's Basketball World Cup: ESPN (2022)
FIBA Asia Cup: ESPN
FIBA Asia Women's Cup: ESPN
FIBA EuroBasket: ESPN
FIBA Intercontinental Cup: Facebook, YouTube, and Twitch
EuroLeague: Fox Sports, NBL TV
EuroCup: NBL TV

Other
NCAA:
 ESPN (until 2023/24)
 Fox Sports: 21 Pac-12 games annually.
NBA Summer League: ESPN
NBA G League: ESPN
The Basketball Tournament: ESPN
Basketball Africa League: ESPN

Combat Sports

AEW Dynamite: ESPN, FITE
AEW Rampage: ESPN, FITE
All Elite Wrestling Pay-Per-View Events: FITE (Live), ESPN (Delay)
Bellator MMA: 10 Play
Other Boxing: : Fox Sports, Main Event, Kayo Sports (through Main Event)
BRACE: Australasia's Mixed Martial Arts Event: UFC.TV (PPV)
Bushido MMA: DAZN (October 2022 to October 2025, all fights)
Cage Warriors: UFC Fight Pass
Dream Boxing: DAZN (October 2022 to October 2025, all fights))
Golden Boy: DAZN and Fox Sports
King of Kings: DAZN (October 2022 to October 2025, all fights))
Matchroom Boxing: DAZN (most fights) and Fox Sports (selected fights)
Premier Boxing Champions: Fox Sports (selected major and PPV fights), Main Event (PPV)
Ultimate Fighting Championship: ESPN (Fight Night and PPV preliminaries), Main Event (PPV), Fetch TV (PPV)
WWE Monday Night Raw: Fox8, BINGE, Kayo Sports, WWE Network
WWE Friday Night SmackDown: Fox8, BINGE, Kayo Sports, WWE Network
WWE NXT: Fox8, BINGE, Kayo Sports, WWE Network
WWE Pay-Per-View Events: BINGE, Kayo Sports, WWE Network

Cricket

International
Test Cricket in Australia: Seven Network and Fox Cricket (2018/19–2030/31),
Women's Test Cricket in Australia: Seven Network and Fox Cricket (2018/19–2030/31)
One-day International Cricket in Australia: Fox Cricket (2018/19–2030/31)
Twenty20 International Cricket in Australia: Fox Cricket (2018/19–2030/31)
Overseas Test cricket :
 Fox Cricket covers most international series, all that involve Australia.
 Nine Network covering The Ashes in England (2023)
Overseas One-day International Cricket:
 Fox Cricket covers most games, all that involve Australia.
Overseas Twenty20 International Cricket:
 Fox Cricket covers most games, all that involve Australia.
ICC Men's Cricket World Cup: Nine Network & Fox Cricket (2023)
ICC Men's T20 World Cup: TBA (2024)
ICC Women's World Cup: TBA (2025)
ICC Women's T20 World Cup:  Fox Cricket (2023)

Domestic/Club
Sheffield Shield: Cricket Network & Kayo Sports (2018/19-2023/24), TBA (2024/25–2029/30)
Marsh One-Day Cup: Cricket Network, Fox Cricket (selected matches and the Final) (2018/19–2023/24), TBA (2024/25–2029/30)
Big Bash League: 
 Seven Network 43 games until 2023/24 & 33 exclusive Games Live from 2024/25 (2018/19–2030/31)
 Fox Cricket 59 games until 2023/24 & 10 exclusive Games Live from 2024/25 (2018/19–2030/31)
Women's Big Bash League: Seven Network, Fox Cricket 23 games only, the rest of the season matches are streamed via Cricket Network & Kayo Sports (2018/19-2030/31)
Governor-General's XI: Fox Cricket (2018/19–2023/24), TBA (2024/25–2029/30)
Super Smash: Fox Cricket (2022/23-)
Indian Premier League: Paramount+ Sports (2023-)
SA20: Fox Cricket (2022/23-)
T20 Blast: Fox Cricket (2022/23-)
Caribbean Premier League: Fox Cricket (2022/23-) 
Bangladesh Premier League: Fox Cricket (2022/23-)
Pakistan Super League: Fox Cricket (2022/23-)
Major League Cricket: Fox Cricket (2022/23-)
International League T20: Fox Cricket (2022/23-)

Exhibition/Other
Allan Border Medal: Seven Network and Fox Cricket
ICC Awards: Fox Cricket

Cycling
UCI World Tour, UCI Women's World Tour: SBS, GCN+, FloSports
Tour Down Under – Seven Network (Every stage live)
Cadel Evans Great Ocean Road Race – Seven Network (Men's and women's race live)
Tour de France – SBS (until 2023)(2023-2030)
Giro d'Italia – SBS, GCN+
Vuelta a España – SBS (Every stage live), GCN+
Paris–Nice – SBS (live), GCN+
Milan–San Remo – GCN+
Tour of Flanders – SBS (Live), FloSports
Paris–Roubaix – SBS (Live), GCN+
Amstel Gold Race – SBS (Live), FloSports
Liège–Bastogne–Liège – SBS (Live), GCN+
Eschborn–Frankfurt – Rund um den Finanzplatz – SBS (Live), GCN+
Critérium du Dauphiné – SBS (Every stage live), GCN+
Giro di Lombardia – GCN+
UCI ProTour, UCI Continental Circuits: SBS, GCN+
UCI Road World Championships – Nine Network, Stan Sport (2022)
Australian National Road Race Championships – SBS (Live)
UCI Track World Championships: SBS on Demand, Fox Sports
Australian National Track Championships – SBS
UCI Track Champions League: SBS on Demand, GCN+
UCI Mountain Bike World Championships – SBS
Cape Epic – SBS
Herald Sun Tour – SBS (Highlights of prologue and first three stages, Stage 4 live)
Tour of California – SBS (Every stage live)

Extensive coverage of other tours available on GCN+ and FloSports.

Esports
Madden Club Championship: ESPN
Madden Bowl: ESPN
EXP Pro-Am APEX Legends: ESPN
EXP Invitational APEX Legends at X Games: ESPN
ELEAGUE: EDGEsport
NBA 2K League: ESPN (Live), eGG Network (Delay)

Extreme Sports
X Games: ESPN & 7mate

Field Hockey
Men's and Women's World Cups: Fox Sports (2022)
Men's and Women's Pro Leagues: Fox Sports (2019–2022)
Australia Kookaburras matches: Fox Sports (2018–2022)
Australia Hockeyroos matches: Fox Sports (2018–2022)
Hockey One: Kayo Sports and Fox Sports (2019–) Semi Finals and Grand Final LIVE
 State Competition's:
Hockey ACT: Broadcast Partner: Wonqy Media

Gaelic Games
International Rules Series in Australia: Seven Network (VIC, SA), 7mate (NSW, QLD, WA)
International Rules Series in the Republic of Ireland: 7mate
GAA - Hurling + Football
GAA.go(App)

Golf
Australian Open: Nine Network (2022–2023)
Australian PGA Championship: Nine Network (2022–2023)
The Masters: Fox Sports
U.S. Open: Fox Sports (2019–2022)
The Open: Fox Sports (2022)
U.S. PGA Championship: Fox Sports (2015–2018)
U.S. LPGA Championship: Fox Sports (2015–2018)
PGA Tour: Fox Sports GolfTV (2019–2030)
World Golf Championships: GolfTV (2019–2022)
Ryder Cup: Fox Sports (2014, 2016, 2018) 
Presidents Cup: Eurosport (2019–2030), Nine Network (2019)
European Tour: Fox Sports (2015–2018)
EurAsia Cup: Fox Sports (2016, 2018)
OneAsia Tour: Fox Sports (2015–2018)
Women's Australian Open: TBA

Gridiron football 
National Football League:
 ESPN: Six live games per week including Thursday (and all NFL Network games), three Sunday afternoon games, Sunday Night Football, Monday Night Football, NFL RedZone, and all playoffs (until 2024).
 Seven Network / 7mate:  two Sunday afternoon live games per week.
Pro Bowl: Seven Network (until 2024), ESPN (until 2033)
Super Bowl: Seven Network ESPN (until 2033) 
NCAA:
 ESPN Australia
 Fox Sports: 13 Pac-12 games annually.

Handball 

 European Men's Handball Championship: beIN Sports (2020-)

Horse-racing
Melbourne Cup Carnival: Network 10 (2019–2023)
Spring Racing Carnival: Seven Network
 Autumn Racing Carnival: Seven Network
 Queensland Winter Racing Carnival: Seven Network
  All Sydney-based horse racings: Seven Network (2005-indefinite future)
 All Victorian race meetings: Racing.com
 All South Australian race meetings: Racing.com
 Other metropolitan, country and international race meetings: Sky Racing
Dubai World Cup: Racing.com
English racing: Racing.com, Seven Network
Kentucky Derby: ESPN
Preakness Stakes: ESPN
Belmont Stakes: ESPN

Ice Hockey
National Hockey League: ESPN (Every Game Live, including postseason, Stanley Cup playoffs & Final, NHL All-Star Weekend, NHL Winter Classic, NHL Stadium Series and more.)
Australian Ice Hockey League: Fox Sports (Game of the Week/Highlights)
CBR Brave: Team Broadcast Partner: Wonqy Media
Melbourne Ice: Team Broadcast Partner: ATC Productions
Melbourne Mustangs: Team Broadcast Partner: ATC Productions
Perth Thunder: Team Broadcast Partner: FRS
Premier Hockey Federation: ESPN
Swedish Hockey League: ESPN

Ironman (Surf lifesaving)
Australian Club Championship: Seven Network
Kellogg's Nutri-Grain Ironman Series Nine Network (2014–2019)
Coolangatta Gold
 Summer of Surf Series (Fox Sports)
 Ocean Thunder (Professional Surfboat Series)

Lacrosse
Major League Lacrosse: ESPN
Women's Professional Lacrosse League: ESPN
World Lacrosse Championship: ESPN

Motorsports
  Repco Supercars Championship: 
 Seven Network (2021–2026) Seven events live plus highlight packages of all remaining race weekends.
 Fox Sports (2021–2026) All practice, qualifying, top ten shootout and races live.
FIA Formula One: 
 Network 10 (2023–2027) Live coverage of the Australian Grand Prix only. 
 Fox Sports (2023–2027) All practice, qualifying, and races live.
Motorcycle Grand Prix (MotoGP): 
 Network 10 (2022–) Live coverage of the Australian motorcycle Grand Prix only. 
 Fox Sports (2022–) Main races live including Moto2 & Moto3 categories and all practice, and qualifying practices.
NASCAR:
NASCAR Cup Series: Fox Sports (Live)
NASCAR Xfinity Series: Fox Sports (Live)
NASCAR Camping World Truck Series: Fox Sports 
IndyCar Series: Stan Sport
AMA Supercross Championship: ESPN, Kayo Sports
AMA Motocross Championship: Stan Sport
FIM Supercross World Championship: 7plus
Australian Supercross Championship: Fox Sports, TBA
ProMX: Stan Sport, SBS, Facebook Live (2022–present)
FIA World Rally Championship: Stan Sport
Australian Rally Championship: 7plus (Highlights)
Australian Off Road Championship: 7plus (Highlights)
Australian Superbike Championship: Fox Sports (2017–) 
Superbike World Championship: Fox Sports (2017–) 
ABB FIA Formula E World Championship: Stan Sport
FIA World Endurance Championship: Stan Sport
24 Hours of Le Mans: Stan Sport
Bathurst 12 Hour: 
 Seven Network / 7mate (2015–present)
 Fox Sports (2020–present) All Practice, Qualifying, Top Ten Shootout and Races live with Ad-free.
Deutsche Tourenwagen Masters: beIN Sports (Live), 7plus (Highlights)

Multi-discipline events
Commonwealth Games: TBA (2026)
Summer Olympics: Nine Network, Stan Sport (2024, 2028, 2032)
Winter Olympics: Nine Network, Stan Sport (2026, 2030)
Paralympic Games: TBA (2024, 2028, 2032)
Special Olympics World Games: ESPN
 Aurora Games: ESPN
European Games: TBA (2023)
Pacific Games: TBA

Netball
Suncorp Super Netball:
 Fox Sports (2022–2026) Every game live on Fox Sports Ad-break free during play.
 Kayo Sports (2022–2026) Every game live 
 Kayo Freebies (2022–2026) 2 games per round streamed for free
INF Netball World Cup: TBA (2023)
Constellation Cup: 
 Fox Sports (2022–2026) Every game live on Fox Sports Ad-break free during play.
 Kayo Sports (2022–2026) Every game live 
SANZEA Netball Quad Series: 
 Fox Sports (2022–2026) Every game live on Fox Sports Ad-break free during play.
 Kayo Sports (2022–2026) Every game live 
Australian Diamonds 
 Fox Sports (2022–2026) Every game live on Fox Sports Ad-break free during play.
 Kayo Sports (2022–2026) Every game live

Poker
World Series of Poker: ESPN

Rugby League
National Rugby League:
 Nine Network (2018–2027) Three games per round. Thursday night (1 match), Friday night (1 match) and Sunday afternoon (1 match). 1 additional game per round on Saturday night for the last 5 rounds of the season simulcast with Fox League.
 Finals series:  Every game of the finals series including the Grand Final.
 Fox League (2017–2027)  5 games per round, live and exclusive nationally, with the other 3 matches simulcast with nine.
 Finals Series: Every game live except the Grand Final, which is replayed.
State of Origin:
 Nine Network (2018–2027): LIVE on Nine
 Fox League: Replay coverage.
NRL Women's: 
 Nine Network (2018–2027)
Fox League (2018–2027)
Hostplus Cup: 
 Nine Network (2012–2027) Finals matches only from 2021
 Fox League (2017–2027)
 Qplus.tv (2022-)
The Knock On Effect NSW Cup: 
 Nine Network (2018–2027) Finals matches only from 2022
 Fox League (2017–2027)
 NSWRLTV (2021-) Live on Facebook one match a week
Super League: 
 Fox League (2017-)
Challenge Cup: 
 Fox League (2017-)
Rugby League World Cup: 
 TBA (2025)
Women's Rugby League World Cup: 
 TBA (2025)
Wheelchair Rugby League World Cup
 TBA (2025)
Physical Disability Rugby League World Cup
 TBA (2025)
Rugby League World Cup 9s 
 TBA (2023)
Four Nations: 
 Nine Network
International Rugby League: 
 Nine Network (2018–2027)
 Fox League (2017-2027)
NRL Touch Premiership: 
 Fox League (2018-)
Rugby League European Championship: 
 Fox League (2018)
The Kangaroos: 
 Nine Network (1994–2027)
 Fox League (2017–2027)
The Jillaroos
 Nine Network (2015-2027)
 Fox League (2017-2027)
Pre Season Challenge: 
 Fox League (2017–2027) Every Game from 2022
Koori Knockout: 
 Fox League (2022–)
Harold Matthews Cup
 NSWRLTV (2020-)
S. G. Ball Cup
 NSWRLTV (2020-)
Tarsha Gale Cup
 NSWRLTV (2020-)
Andrew Johns Cup
 NSWRLTV (2020-)
Laurie Daley Cup
 NSWRLTV (2020-)
NSWRL Women's Premiership
 NSWRLTV (2020-)

Rugby Union

Major Competitions
Rugby World Cup: 
Stan Sport (all 48 games live streamed)
Nine Network (all Wallabies matches and the RWC Final)
The Rugby Championship:
Nine Network (2021–2023): Wallabies games and other selected games
 Stan Sport (2021–2023): All Rugby Championship matches
Bledisloe Cup:
Nine Network (2021–2023): All matches live and free
Stan Sport (2021–2023): All matches live
Wallabies Rugby Internationals:
Nine Network (2021–2023): Home internationals
 Stan Sport (2021–2023): Home internationals
Wallabies Spring Tour: 
Stan Sport (2021–2023): All matches live
Super Rugby Pacific: 
Nine Network (2021–2023): One live match each Saturday night; One finals match live and free each weekend
 Stan Sport (2021–2023): All matches live
Super W: 
 Stan Sport (2021–2023): All matches live
Nine Network (2022–2023): A selected match live each week; the grand final live and free

Minor and Foreign Competitions
Shute Shield:
Nine Network (2021–2023) Four matches per season
Stan Sport (2021–2023): All matches live
Hospital Cup: 
Nine Network (2021–2023): Four matches per season 
Stan Sport (2021–2023): All matches live
European Rugby Champions Cup: TBD
Mitre 10 Cup: Stan Sport (2021–2023): All matches live
Currie Cup: Stan Sport (2021–2023): All matches live
Six Nations Championship: Stan Sport 
English Premiership: Stan Sport
Pro14: TBD
England, Scotland, Wales, Ireland, Italy and France home internationals: beIN Sports

Sailing
Sydney to Hobart Yacht Race: Seven Network (until 2023)
America's Cup: Fox Sports (2021)

Swimming
Australian Swimming Championships: TBA (2023)
FINA World Aquatics Championships: Nine Network (2023)
FINA World Swimming Championships (25 m): TBA (2024)
Pan Pacific Swimming Championships: TBA (2026)
International Swimming League: 7plus

Ten-pin bowling
World Tenpin Masters: Fox Sports

Tennis
Australian Open Series
Australian Open: Nine Network (2019–2029), Stan Sport (2022–2029)
Adelaide International: Nine Network (2019–2029), Stan Sport (2022–2029)
Hobart International: Nine Network (2019–2029), Stan Sport (2022–2029)
Kooyong Classic: SBS (2019–2024)
United Cup: Nine Network (2023–2029), Stan Sport (2023–2029)
French Open: Nine Network (2021–2023), Stan Sport (2021–2023)
Wimbledon: Nine Network (2021–2023), Stan Sport (2021–2023)
US Open: Nine Network (2022–2024), Stan Sport (2022–2024)
Davis Cup: Nine Network (Australia matches only) and beIN Sports
Fed Cup: Nine Network (Australia matches only) and beIN Sports
ATP
ATP Tour (except Australian Tournaments)
ATP Tour Finals: beIN Sports 
ATP Tour Masters 1000: beIN Sports
ATP Tour 500: beIN Sports 
ATP Tour 250: beIN Sports
Next Generation ATP Finals: beIN Sports
Laver Cup: Stan Sport (2021-)
WTA Tour (except Australian Tournaments)
WTA Finals: beIN Sports (2017–2021)
WTA Elite Trophy: beIN Sports (2017–2021) 
WTA Premier tournaments: beIN Sports (2017–2021) 
WTA International tournaments: beIN Sports (2017–2021)
Diriyah Tennis Cup: beIN Sports, Stan Sport
Mubadala World Tennis Championship: Stan Sport
World Tennis League: Stan Sport

Ultimate Frisbee 

 American Ultimate Disc League (AUDL): ESPN (2020-)

Volleyball
FIVB:
Men's and Women's Nations Leagues: Fox Sports and Volleyballworld.TV
Men's and Women's World Championships: Volleyballworld.TV
CEV:
Men's and Women's World Championships: L'Équipe

References

Sports television in Australia
Australia